Inconstant is the name of several merchant and naval ships including:

 The brig , built in 1811, in which Napoleon escaped from Elba in 1815
 The brig Inconstant, launched in 1811 in France, that became Swiftsure and that was wrecked c.1831.
 The sailing ship , built in 1848, which played an important role in the history of Wellington, New Zealand as "Plimmer's Ark"
 Six ships of the British Royal Navy have been named HMS Inconstant, see .

See also
 Inconstancy (disambiguation)

Ship names